Kirstie Kasko (born 13 October 1992) is a Canadian Paralympic swimmer who competes in international level events.

Kasko took a break from swimming in 2014 when she had blackouts and epileptic seizures at a swimming pool in Calgary. She was diagnosed with epilepsy at age 21. However this was not a surprise as Kirstie had six grand mal seizures at age 2.

References

External links
 
 

1992 births
Living people
People from Okotoks
People from High River
Paralympic swimmers of Canada
Swimmers at the 2012 Summer Paralympics
People with epilepsy
Medalists at the 2011 Parapan American Games
Medalists at the 2015 Parapan American Games
Canadian female backstroke swimmers
Canadian female freestyle swimmers
Canadian female breaststroke swimmers
Canadian female medley swimmers
S14-classified Paralympic swimmers
21st-century Canadian women